Dàzhuāng (大庄) could refer to the following locations in China:

 Dazhuang, Yinan County, in Yinan County, Shandong
 Dazhuang Township, Minhe County, in Minhe Hui and Tu Autonomous County, Qinghai
 Dazhuang Township, Gangu County, in Gansu

Dàzhuāng (大庄) may also refer to the following location in Taiwan:
 Dazhuang, Hualien County, Taiwan, a community of indigenous Taivoan, Makatao, and Siraya in Fuli, Hualien